Gereja Kristen Protestan Simalungun (GKPS - Simalungun Protestant Christian Church) is a Lutheran and Reformed Protestant church formally founded to spread Christianity among the Simalungun people, a tribe living in Simalungun, North Sumatra, Indonesia. It has a baptized membership of 211,383.

History
August Theis led a group of German missionaries to spread Christianity to the Simalungun area after he received a telegram from the local Rheinische Missionsgesellschaft (RMG - Deutschlands-based sending institution) leader. On September 2, 1903 they arrived at Pematang Raya to begin their mission among the Simalungunese. September 2 has been celebrated each year by GKPS all over the world as an olob-olob (Simalungunese for joyous) day to thank God that the Bible has entered Simalungun.

The sending mission was effectively started in 1904 with August Theis at Pematang Raya and Guillaume at Purba Saribu (western part of Simalungun). Not until 1909 did the first Simalungunese Christian baptism occur at Pematang Raya. Later in the same year, 38 other Simalungunese were baptized at Parapat.

Up to 1910, 17 churches were founded inside the Simalungun area. They were:
 Tigaras, August 15, 1903
 Tinjoan, August 15, 1903
 Pematang Raya, September 2, 1903
 Raya Usang, September 8, 1903
 Dolok Saribu, September 14, 1903
 Bulu Raya, June 16, 1904
 Purba Saribu, June 10, 1905
 Haranggaol, March 3, 1906
 Raya Tongah, June 7, 1906
 Purba Dolok, August 15, 1906
 Pamatang Purba, August 15, 1906
 Purba Tongah, 1906
 Hinalang, 8 September 1908
 Kariahan, 1908
 Saribudolok, 6 September 1909
 Tambun Raya, 2 November 1909

The first missions were held using the Toba language. Simalungunese resistance to the Westerners and their lack of comprehension of the Toba language decreased RMG effectiveness and therefore held back the growth of Christianity among the Simalungunese.

On September 1, 1928, the celebration of the 25th anniversary of Christianity at Simalungun was held at Pematang Raya. On this occasion, some Guru (teachers) and Sintua (deacons) agreed to found a committee which planned to translate church-related text books into the Simalungun language. This produced Haleluya (singing book) and Manna (daily reading book).

On November 15 of the same year, a group called "Kongsi Laita" (laita means "let's go") was founded at Sondiraya by some members of the Pematang Raya church to ask the Simalungunese to spread Christianity by themselves to others.

Simalungun District inside HKBP Simalungun
On September 26, 1940, all of the churches inside the Simalungun area were officially grouped together as a single district inside HKBP (Huria Kristen Batak Protestan). 12 years later on October 5, 1952, Simalungun District synod members held a meeting to prepare a separation between themselves and HKBP. The new church was called HKBPS (HKBP-Simalungun).

HKBPS reorganized themselves on November 30, 1952, by dividing themselves into three districts. An administrative office was also built in Sudirman Street, Pematang Siantar, as a headquarters.

HKBP-Simalungun transformation into GKPS
HKBPS transformed its organization and name into Gereja Kristen Protestan Simalungun (GKPS) on September 1, 1963. In order to serve the Simalungunese better, GKPS founded its educational center at Pematang Raya and a dormitory for boys and girls. GKPS also founded a centre for agricultural training on January 15, 1964, at Pematang Siantar, which is called PELPEM GKPS.

Church co-operation
GKPS was accepted into Persekutuan Gereja-gereja Indonesia (PGI, or Indonesian churches association) in 1963. GKPS has also always co-operated strongly with Lutheran churches around the world such as the Evangelical Lutheran Church in America (ELCA)
and the Lutheran Church of Australia (LCA). On the international level, GKPS is registered in several international church organization such as:
World Council of Churches (WCC)
Christian Conference of Asia
Lutheran World Federation

GKPS' other overseas partners include:
Mülheim Church (Germany)
UEM (United Evangelical Mission)
EZE (Evangelische Zentralstelle für Entwicklunghilfe)
Brot für die Welt
Kirchenkreis Hagen
Kirchenkreis Solingen
Kirscht di Hacenburg
Dekanat Bad Marienberg

References

External links

 Official site
 GKPS Tegal Alur, Resort Tanggerang, Distrik VII

1963 establishments in Indonesia
Lutheran denominations established in the 20th century
Lutheran World Federation members
Lutheranism in Indonesia
Religious organizations based in Indonesia
Christian organizations established in 1963